Union Township is one of thirteen townships in Parke County, Indiana, United States. As of the 2010 census, its population was 1,562 and it contained 1,451 housing units.

History
The West Union Covered Bridge was listed on the National Register of Historic Places in 1978.

Geography

Unincorporated towns
 Bellmore at 
 Ferndale at 
 Hollandsburg at 
 Madalline at 
(This list is based on USGS data and may include former settlements.)

Cemeteries
The township contains these five cemeteries: Blake, Burton, Martin, Roach and Thomas.

Major highways
  U.S. Route 36
  Indiana State Road 59

School districts
 Rockville Community Schools

Political districts
 State House District 44
 State Senate District 38

References
 
 United States Census Bureau 2009 TIGER/Line Shapefiles
 IndianaMap

External links
 Indiana Township Association
 United Township Association of Indiana
 City-Data.com page for Union Township

Townships in Parke County, Indiana
Townships in Indiana